Markowizna  is a village in the Gmina Ogrodzieniec, Zawiercie County, Silesian Voivodeship, Poland.

References

Markowizna